Sekolah Menengah Kebangsaan Agama Tun Ahmadshah (formerly known as SMKA Inanam) is a religious school in Kota Kinabalu, Sabah, Malaysia. The school was established in 1988.

History 

SMKA Inanam was initiated on 1 January 1988 as a normal secondary school. The first batch of the school consisted of 14 teachers and 455 students led by the first Principal, Mr. Matshah Abdul Hamid. At the end of 1988, a proposal to make this school an Islamic secondary school was moved as the original Islamic secondary school in Ranau was under construction. State Education Department was in favour of such proposal as this school is located strategically near administrative centre. 

Consequently, 20 teachers and a number of students of Form 5 and Upper Form 6 from SMKA Limauan joined this school on 3 January 1989, while the school, which was known as SMK Inanam, was renamed as SMKA Inanam. It was renamed once again to SMKA Tun Ahmadshah on 9 September 2009 in commemoration of the then Governor of Sabah, Ahmadshah Abdullah.

Roll of principals

Classes
The names of the classes change every three years for the junior form and every two years for the senior form.

Lower Form

Upper Form

References

External links 
 

Schools
Schools in Sabah
Secondary schools in Malaysia
1988 establishments in Malaysia
Educational institutions established in 1988